Anacampsis homoplasta is a moth of the family Gelechiidae. It was described by Edward Meyrick in 1932. It is found in Japan and Russia.

References

Moths described in 1932
Anacampsis
Moths of Japan
Moths of Asia